Rajput Ramani is a 1936 Hindi adventure movie directed by Keshavrao Dhaiber.

External links 

 Rajput Ramani at indiancine.ma

Articles containing video clips
1930s Hindi-language films